Joseph Beauvollier de Courchant was Governor general of Pondicherry and Réunion in the French Colonial Empire.

Titles

Governors of French India
Governors of Réunion